Suspense is a 1930 British war film directed by Walter Summers and starring Mickey Brantford, Cyril McLaglen and Jack Raine. The battle effects were created under the supervision of Cliff Richardson at Elstree Studios which was owned by British International Pictures. The film's sets were designed by John Mead. It is an adaptation of the play of the same title by Patrick MacGill.

Premise
During the First World War a British unit take up a new position in a trench unaware that the Germans are laying a mine underneath it.

Cast
 Mickey Brantford as Private Pettigrew
 Cyril McLaglen as Cyril McClusky
 Jack Raine as Captain Wilson
 Hay Petrie as Scruffy
Fred Groves as Private Lomax
 Percy Parsons as Private Brett
 Syd Crossley as Corporal Brown
 Hamilton Keene as Officer

References

External links
 

1930 films
Films shot at British International Pictures Studios
1930s English-language films
Films directed by Walter Summers
1930 war films
British war films
Films set in France
British black-and-white films
1930s British films